The 1963 NCAA Men's Ice Hockey Tournament was the culmination of the 1962–63 NCAA men's ice hockey season, the 16th such tournament in NCAA history. It was held between March 14 and 16, 1963, and concluded with North Dakota defeating Denver 6-5. All games were played at the McHugh Forum in Chestnut Hill, Massachusetts.

Qualifying teams
Four teams qualified for the tournament, two each from the eastern and western regions. The ECAC tournament champion and the WCHA tournament champion received automatic bids into the tournament. Harvard, the ECAC champion, declined the bid to the tournament and was instead replaced by the runner-up Boston College. Two at-large bids were offered to one eastern and one western team based upon both their tournament finish as well as their regular season record.

Format
The ECAC champion was seeded as the top eastern team while the WCHA champion was given the top western seed. The second eastern seed was slotted to play the top western seed and vice versa. All games were played at the Meehan Auditorium. All matches were Single-game eliminations with the semifinal winners advancing to the national championship game and the losers playing in a consolation game.

Bracket

Note: * denotes overtime period(s)

Semifinals

Boston College vs. North Dakota

Denver vs. Clarkson

Consolation Game

Boston College vs. Clarkson

National Championship

Denver vs. North Dakota

All-Tournament team

First Team
G: Tom Apprille (Boston College)
D: George Goodacre (North Dakota)
D: Don Ross (North Dakota)
F: Al McLean* (North Dakota)
F: Dave Merrifield (North Dakota)
F: Don Stokaluk (North Dakota)
* Most Outstanding Player(s)

Second Team
G: Wayne Gibbons (Clarkson)
D: Jim Kenning (Denver)
D: Maurice Roberge (North Dakota)
F: Jack Leetch (Boston College)
F: Corby Adams (Clarkson)
F: Bob Hamill (Denver)

References

Tournament
NCAA Division I men's ice hockey tournament
NCAA Men's Ice Hockey Tournament
NCAA Men's Ice Hockey Tournament
1960s in Boston
Ice hockey competitions in Boston